Robert Henry "Bob" Gurr (born October 25, 1931 in Los Angeles, California) is an American amusement ride designer and Imagineer. His most famous work was for Walt Disney's Disneyland Park, and its subsequent sister parks. Gurr is said to have designed most, if not all, of the ride vehicles of the Disneyland attractions when the park opened, including Autopia, The Haunted Mansion, the Disneyland Monorail, the Submarine Voyage, and the Matterhorn Bobsleds. He was named a Disney Legend in 2004. He also worked on the King Kong Encounter animatronic for Universal Studios Hollywood.

Career
Gurr began his career with Disney designing the Autopia vehicles, and helping to create the Abraham Lincoln audio-animatronic for Disney's attraction at the 1964 World's Fair. Gurr designed two 1910 era vehicles for Disneyland's Main Street U.S.A. The Carnation Wagon was designed for Carnation and was parked aside the Carnation Ice Cream Parlor, creating a photo opportunity for guests. It was built on a Model A chassis with Model T wheels. The body was designed by following guidance from his automobile book Antique American Cars by Floyd Clymer and old automobile magazines from the studio's library. Gurr also designed the 1910 style replica fire engine for the firehouse in the Town Square.  He later gave himself the title of Director of Special Vehicle Development.

Gurr retired from Disney in 1981 to open his own firm Gurr Design, Inc. He created animated light spiders and other effects for The Jacksons Victory Tour. In 1984, Gurr created the UFO spectacle that closed out the opening ceremony of the 1984 Summer Olympics. In 1984, Gurr joined with former Imagineer Dave Schweninger to cofound Sequoia Creative. That firm, under Gurr's aegis, developed the 30-foot tall King Kong Encounter animatronic and the animatronic serpent in The Adventures of Conan: A Sword and Sorcery Spectacular for Universal Studios Hollywood. Sequoia Creative built the giant animatronic of the Tunnel du temps stunt show in Big Bang Schtroumpf, 1989 (now Walygator Parc), France.

In 1997, when casino magnate Steve Wynn wanted to sink a pirate ship several times nightly at his Treasure Island Hotel and Casino, he called upon Gurr, who figured out how to do it.

Gurr also helped consult for the T-Rex animatronic in Jurassic Park and for the animatronic used in 1998's Godzilla.

Books
In the 1950s Gurr was the author and illustrator of two books, both published by D. Post Publications and out of print, on the subject of auto design: How to Draw Cars of Tomorrow  in 1952, and Automobile Design: The Complete Styling Book  in 1955. 

In 2012, Gurr authored Design: Just For Fun  a 216-page hardcover book on his career in themed entertainment design at Disneyland and beyond. With a foreword by Marty Sklar, the book has since gone out of print and is highly valued by collectors.
Gurr's memoir BOB GURR: Legendary Imagineer: Life and Times – Disney and Beyond  was published in 2019.

Awards and honors
In 1999, Gurr was awarded the Themed Entertainment Association's THEA award for lifetime achievement.
In 2004, in a ceremony at the Disney Studios in Burbank, CA, Gurr was inducted as a Disney Legend. Gurr also has received the honor of having his name appear on Main Street, U.S.A. windows at both Disneyland and the Magic Kingdom parks.

See also
Rail transport in Walt Disney Parks and Resorts

References

External links

 Official site of Bob Gurr
 Disney Legend Bob Gurr – D23.com
 Disney Legend Bob Gurr: Filling in the Gaps

Living people
1931 births
Disney imagineers
Disney people
Animatronic engineers
American amusement park developers